Sargon Abraham (born 7 February 1991) is a Swedish professional footballer who plays for Örgryte IS as a forward.

Club career
Abraham has played for IFK Skövde, Skövde AIK, Degerfors IF and IFK Göteborg. He won the 2019–20 Svenska Cupen, to be his first title with IFK Göteborg.

Honours
IFK Göteborg
 Svenska Cupen: 2019–20

References

External links 
 

1991 births
Living people
Swedish men's footballers
Allsvenskan players
IFK Skövde players
Skövde AIK players
Degerfors IF players
IFK Göteborg players
Örgryte IS players
Swedish people of Assyrian/Syriac descent
Swedish people of Syrian descent
Syrian Christians
Association football forwards
Swedish men's futsal players
Swedish international futsal players
Assyrian footballers
People from Skövde Municipality
Sportspeople from Västra Götaland County